The Oklahoma State University Cowboys basketball team plane crash occurred on January 27, 2001, at 19:37 EST, when a Beechcraft Super King Air 200, registration N81PF, carrying two players on the Oklahoma State Cowboys basketball team along with six Oklahoma State broadcasters and members of the Oklahoma State coaching staff, crashed in a field  east of Denver, near Strasburg, in the U.S. state of Colorado. The pilot had become disoriented in a snow storm. The plane was flying from Jefferson County Airport to Stillwater Regional Airport after the team's loss to the Colorado Buffaloes.  

The plane was carrying two crew members (pilot Denver Mills, and co-pilot Bjorn Fahlstrom) and eight passengers involved with Oklahoma State basketball. All 10 individuals died. Oklahoma State has a memorial erected to them, entitled "Remember the Ten", inside Gallagher-Iba Arena in Stillwater, Oklahoma.

Victims
The ten victims were:

Kendall C. Durfey, television/radio engineer (born August 1, 1962); 
Bjorn G. Fahlstrom, corporate aviation pilot (born February 13, 1970);
Nathan Z. Fleming, scholar/athlete (born September 11, 1980);
William R. Hancock III, media relations coordinator (born April 6, 1969);
Daniel P. Lawson, Jr., scholar/athlete (born July 28, 1979);
Brian W. Luinstra, athletic trainer (born July 26, 1971);
Denver R. Mills, CPA by profession, pilot by passion (born January 31, 1945);
Pat Noyes, director of basketball operations (born July 11, 1973);
William B. Tietgens (Bill Teegins), sportscaster/voice of the Cowboys (born July 26, 1952);
Jared G. Weiberg, student assistant (born March 9, 1978)

See also
 List of accidents involving sports teams
 2011 Arkansas Piper Cherokee crash – the second plane crash in 10 years to involve an Oklahoma State basketball team

References

Oklahoma State Cowboys basketball
Aviation accidents and incidents in the United States in 2001
Aviation accidents and incidents involving sports teams
Aviation accidents and incidents in Colorado
2000–01 Big 12 Conference men's basketball season
2001 in Oklahoma
2001 in Colorado
Accidents and incidents involving the Beechcraft Super King Air
January 2001 events in the United States